Subhash Ankush Shirodkar is an Indian politician of the Bharatiya Janata Party. He is a former Member of the Legislative Assembly and represented Siroda in the Goa Legislative Assembly.

Personal life
Subhash Ankush Shirodkar was born on 23 February 1952.

Career

Member of the Legislative Assembly
Shirodkar was served as the Sarpanch of the Shiroda Gram Panchayat from 1978 to 1984. He was elected to the Goa, Daman, and Diu Legislative Assembly in the 1984 Assembly Elections from the Shiroda constituency as a candidate of the Indian National Congress. Shirodkar successfully contested the 1989 Goa Legislative Assembly elections from the Shiroda constituency as a candidate of the Indian National Congress. He also won the Goa Legislative Assembly elections of 1994, 1999 and 2002 from the Shiroda constituency as a candidate of the Indian National Congress.

Subhash Shirodkar lost the 2007 Goa Legislative Assembly election from the Shiroda constituency to Mahadev Naik of the Bharatiya Janata Party. Shirodkar contested the 2012 Goa Legislative Assembly election from the Siroda constituency as the Indian National Congress party's candidate, but lost to Mahadev Naik of the Bharatiya Janata Party.

Shirodkar returned to the Goa Legislative Assembly as an Indian National Congress candidate by defeating Mahadev Naik of the Bharatiya Janata Party in the 2012 Goa Legislative Assembly election. Shirodkar quit the Indian National Congress on 16 October 2018 and resigned as the Member of the Legislative Assembly, to join the Bharatiya Janata Party.

Cabinet Minister
Shirodkar was a Cabinet Minister in the Government of Goa headed by Pratapsingh Rane from 1985 to 1989 and held the portfolios of Information, Agriculture, Animal Husbandry & Veterinary Services, Forests, Cooperation and Town & Country Planning. He also served as a Cabinet Minister in the Ravi Naik Ministry from 19 June 1991 to 18 May 1993 and in the Wilfred de Souza Ministry from 18 May 1993 to March 1994, where he held the portfolios of Education, Art & Culture, Information & Technology, Sports & Youth Affairs and Inland Waterways.

From 30 November 1998 to 8 February 1999, Shirodkar was a Cabinet Minister in the Luizinho Faleiro Ministry and held the portfolios of Public Works Department, Industries and Printing & Stationery.

Shirodkar served as the Cabinet Minister in the second Luizinho Faleiro from  14 September 1999 to 24 November 1999 and was entrusted with the portfolios of Urban Development, Education, Archives & Archaeology, Museum & Gazetteers and Official Language. He was also a Cabinet Minister in the Francisco Sardinha Ministry from 24 November 1999 to 20 October 2000 with the portfolios of Public Works Department, Mining and Information.

Other offices held
Shirodkar also served as the President of the Goa Pradesh Congress Committee. He is a former Chairman of the All Goa Kabaddi Association and the former President of the Goa Olympic Association.

He is the Chairman of the Shivgram Education Society, which manages various educational institutions in Shiroda, Goa. The Shivgram Education Society manages the Shree Rayeshwar Institute of Engineering and Information Technology, Shri Kamaxshi Devi Homeopathic Medical College & Hospital, Shiroda Higher Secondary School, Shri Brahmadurga High School, School of Symbiosis and the Daffodils Primary School.

On 31 October 2018, Shirodkar was appointed the Chairman of the  Economic Development Corporation (EDC), a financial institution of the Government of Goa.

References

Living people
Former members of Indian National Congress from Goa
Bharatiya Janata Party politicians from Goa
Goa MLAs 2017–2022
Year of birth missing (living people)
Goa MLAs 2022–2027
Goa MLAs 1984–1989
Goa MLAs 1989–1994
Goa MLAs 1994–1999
Goa MLAs 1999–2002
Goa MLAs 2002–2007